The XRCO Hall of Fame lists well-known adult entertainment works and workers. The list is managed by X-Rated Critics Organization and inducted annually during the XRCO Awards. The first XRCO Awards were presented in Hollywood on February 14, 1985. Inductees must have been industry members for at least ten years.

Members are listed in the order that they were inducted, with the year they were inducted, if known:

Actors

Actresses

Directors

Fifth Estate
Auxiliary Fields

Film Creators

Film Pioneers

Films (with year of release)

Outlaws of Porn

Paladin Awards
"This unique special-achievement award is given periodically by the XRCO to acknowledge companies or individuals who have gone the extra distance for the adult-film industry."

Special awards

XRCO Members' Choice

References
 
 Adam Film World Guide Directory annuals, 1987–88, 1990–2005 and 2008

External links
 
 XRCO Hall of Fame listing thru 2011

American pornographic film awards
Lists of pornographic film actors
Halls of fame in California
Entertainment halls of fame